Franciszek Jamroż (19 May 1943 – 25 January 2023) was a Polish politician who was the mayor of Gdańsk, Poland from 1991 to 1994. He was charged with corruption and bribery and was imprisoned.

References

1943 births
2023 deaths
Centre Agreement politicians
Mayors of Gdańsk
Gdańsk University of Technology alumni
People from Stalowa Wola